Phyllis Eileen Williams Bardeau (Gayanögwad) is a Seneca author, and educator, and lexicographer. She is best known for her work on the Seneca language, including Seneca language dictionaries.

Personal
Bardeau was born in 1934 on the Allegany Indian Reservation in Cattaraugus County, New York. She grew up speaking Seneca with her grandmother on a farm in Coldspring, New York. Following her marriage she moved to the Cattaraugus Reservation

in 1951, and began to teach the Seneca Language, first to a class of adults, then at the high school in Gowanda, New York. She then attended the State University of New York at Buffalo, earning a masters' degree in American Studies in 1994. She served as an instructor there, and developed a syllabus for courses in the Seneca Language, which were offered beginning in 2019.

She worked on standardizing the Seneca syllabary. She also collaborated with Wallace Chafe on his English–Seneca Dictionary.

In 1990 she returned to the Allegany Reservation, where she now works on writing, research and documentation of the Seneca Language, and providing support for Seneca Language programs there.

Publications
Bardeau is the author of several books on Seneca Language and culture.

References

1934 births
Living people
Seneca people
University at Buffalo alumni
Women lexicographers
American lexicographers
20th-century lexicographers
Native American language revitalization